Ranald Bannerman's Boyhood is a realistic, largely autobiographical, novel by George MacDonald. It was first published in 1871. The original edition was illustrated by Arthur Hughes.

Plot introduction 
Ranald Bannerman's Boyhood is a story of a young motherless boy growing up with his brothers in a Scottish manse. The list of characters includes: The wicked sneaking, housekeeper, Mrs. Mitchel, Kirsty, an enchanting Highland storyteller, Turkey, the intrepid cowherd, the strange Wandering Willie, the evil Kelpie, the sweet horse Missie, and the lovely Elsie Duff. Throughout the twists and turns of his escapades and adventures, Ranald learns from his father the important lessons of courage and integrity.

Literary significance and criticism 
"full of sweetness, full of boy-life and true goodness". (New York Independent, 1871)
"Mr. Macdonald writes of youthful experiences in a way unequaled by any other author of the day, and this volume is in his best style." -Boston Post

References

External links 
 
 

1871 British novels
Novels by George MacDonald
Novels about orphans
Novels set in Aberdeenshire
British autobiographical novels